Almádena  is a village located in Portugal's western Algarve.  Administratively, it is part of the civil parish (freguesia) of Luz, (popularly known as Praia da Luz), and the municipality (município) of Lagos.

Etymology
According to certain authorities, the toponym 'Almádena' has an Arabic origin, like many place names in the area. The name is assumed to derive from the Arabic word for minaret (al-madin).

Geography

The village is located in the Vale de Barão.  It lies 3 km north of the fishing village of Burgau and 4 km from Luz itself, just outside of the boundary of the Southwest Alentejo and Vicentine Coast Natural Park.

Almádena's location is on the edge of fertile sedimentary deposits including the 'ribeiras' of Almádena, of Burgau and of the Vale de Barão.  Anecdotal evidence suggest that, in the past, the land was very fruitful and that Almádena's inhabitants were the richest in the freguesia of Luz but this may also be because they were also hard working.

Local farmers' focused on fig cultivation rather than almonds, olives or carob beans, which were more ubiquitous to the east.     However, one additional crop, rice, flourished and was consequently grown in the irrigable lowlands south west of the village.

Some sources state that Almádena's location was originally on the sea at Boca do Rio, with the villagers resorting to the present inland site out of fear after the 1755 earthquake and its associated tidal wave.  However, cartographic evidence dating from before 1755 suggests that village's location before this event was unchanged from its present location

Buildings

Almádena resembles many rural villages in the Algarve.  Its housing stock mainly consists of small white houses with traditional chimneys, a domestic architectural style influenced by the Moorish occupation of the area up to the thirteenth century.  
There is a small market for farmers' produce and a community centre in the heart of the village as well as several bars and restaurants.  The main square in the village (Largo do Poço), unusually, has as its centre-piece a  traditional farm well.

Nearby buildings of interest include Quinta das Alagoas:  A fourteenth century fortified farmhouse and known locally as the "Roman Farm", now converted into holiday accommodation.  Some brickwork found on the site suggests that its origins could indeed go back as far as Roman times.

References

External links
 Pictures of Almádena:  Places in the South West Algarve

Villages in Portugal
Villages in the Algarve
Populated places in Faro District